Llangennith, Llanmadoc and Cheriton is a rural community on the Gower Peninsula, Swansea, south Wales.  It comprises the villages of Llangennith, Llanmadoc and Cheriton. Together they share a community council.

The community is bordered by Rhossili and Port Eynon to the south, Llanrhidian Lower and Reynoldston to the east.

The population was 882 in 2011.

The community includes the island of Burry Holms.

References

External links
Llangennith, Llanmadoc & Cheriton Community Council

Communities in Swansea
Populated places on the Gower Peninsula